Anne Naysmith (née Smith; 1937 – 10 February 2015) was a British classical pianist who became notable later in life for sleeping rough in Chiswick, West London.

She was born in Southend-on-Sea, Essex in 1937. Her family moved to Hounslow, West London when she was eight. The 'Nay' was added much later.

Naysmith studied with Harold Craxton and Liza Fuchsova at the Royal Academy of Music, and gave a well received recital at Wigmore Hall in 1967, but experienced personal difficulties in the late 1960s and was evicted from her house in Prebend Gardens, Chiswick. Following her eviction Naysmith slept in her car, a Ford Consul, for 26 years until 2002 when it was towed away following campaigning from neighbours to have it removed. Naysmith then lived in a handmade shelter next to Stamford Brook Underground station.

The Guardian noted parallels with Mary Shepherd, the subject of Alan Bennett's 1999 play The Lady in the Van, who had also been a classical pianist.

At 01:00 on 10 February 2015 Naysmith died after being struck by a lorry on Chiswick High Road. She was buried at Chiswick New Cemetery on 7 March 2015.

References

1937 births
Date of birth unknown
2015 deaths
English classical pianists
English women pianists
Homeless people
People from Chiswick
Alumni of the Royal Academy of Music
Musicians from London
Women classical pianists
20th-century classical pianists
Road incident deaths in London
Pedestrian road incident deaths
20th-century English musicians
20th-century English women musicians
20th-century women pianists